Ryan Vincent Peters (born 21 August 1987) is a retired English semi-professional footballer who played as a right back. He began his career at Brentford in the Football League and after his release in 2008, he dropped into non-League football and played until his retirement in 2019. He is currently assistant manager at Maidenhead United.

Playing career

Brentford 
After beginning his career as a forward and winger, Peters graduated from the Brentford youth team to the first team during the 2004–05 League One season and made his senior debut as a 51st-minute substitute for Jay Tabb in a 3–0 defeat to Peterborough United on 21 August 2004. He made his first start for the club in the following match, lasting 54 minutes of a 2–0 League Cup first round defeat to Ipswich Town, before being substituted for Jay Tabb. After a period away on loan in late 2004, Peters returned to the team in early 2005 and signed a one-year professional contract, with the option of a further year, effective from the end of the 2004–05 season. He scored the first senior goal of his career in a 3–3 draw with Sheffield Wednesday on 25 February 2005. Peters finished the 2004–05 season with 12 appearances and one goal.

Over the course of the 2005–06 and 2006–07 seasons, Peters failed to break through into the first team and after Brentford's relegation to League Two and the appointment of new manager Terry Butcher in 2007, he fell out of favour. He made six appearances in the first two months of the 2007–08 season before leaving on loan and then being released in January 2008. During  seasons at Griffin Park, Peters made 47 appearances and scored two goals.

Non-League football 
While a Brentford player, Peters had loan spells at Conference Premier clubs Gravesend & Northfleet, Crawley Town and Isthmian League Premier Division club AFC Wimbledon. He joined Isthmian League Premier Division club Margate on loan in October 2007 and joined the club on a permanent transfer in January 2008. He moved up to the Conference South to join Braintree Town in 2009 and one season later, he won the first silverware of his career when the Iron won the 2010–11 Conference South title. He played on for four further seasons at Braintree Town before leaving Cressing Road at the end of the 2014–15 season, by which time he had made 202 appearances and scored two goals for the club. Peters dropped back down to the National League South to follow former Braintree Town manager Alan Devonshire to Maidenhead United in May 2015. In his second season with the Magpies, he helped the club to the National League South title. He played on into the 2018–19 season, which was his last as a player.

International career 
Peters was capped by England Futsal in 2008.

Coaching career 
In 2012, Peters returned to Brentford to work in the club's Community Sports Trust and as of October 2020, he was the Trust's Elite Development Programme coach. From 2015 to May 2017, he coached Brentford Women. In May 2015, Peters joined National League South club Maidenhead United as player-first team coach and he was promoted into the role of assistant manager at the end of the 2018–19 season.

Personal life 
Peters is godfather to former Brentford teammate Karleigh Osborne's son.

Career statistics

Honours 
Braintree Town
 Conference South: 2010–11
Maidenhead United
 National League South: 2016–17

References

External links 

Ryan Peters at pitchero.com

1987 births
Living people
English footballers
Footballers from Wandsworth
Brentford F.C. players
Ebbsfleet United F.C. players
Crawley Town F.C. players
AFC Wimbledon players
Margate F.C. players
Braintree Town F.C. players
Maidenhead United F.C. players
English Football League players
National League (English football) players
Isthmian League players
Association football fullbacks
Association football forwards
Association football wingers
Brentford F.C. non-playing staff